The Pro-Cathedral of Our Lady of the Light is a Roman Catholic church in the city of Mindelo, on the island of São Vicente, Cape Verde. It is located on Rua da Luz, in the city centre. Built in 1862, it is one of the oldest buildings of Mindelo. However, the church has been enlarged recently, leaving  only the façade in its original state. It is the seat of the Roman Catholic Diocese of Mindelo, created in 2003.

See also
Roman Catholicism in Cape Verde
Pro-cathedral
List of buildings and structures in São Vicente, Cape Verde
List of churches in Cape Verde

References

Roman Catholic cathedrals in Cape Verde
Buildings and structures in Mindelo
Roman Catholic churches completed in 1963
Portuguese colonial architecture in Cape Verde
20th-century Roman Catholic church buildings